Fisgard Lighthouse National Historic Site, on Fisgard Island at the mouth of Esquimalt Harbour in Colwood, British Columbia, is the site of Fisgard Lighthouse, the first lighthouse on the west coast of Canada.

The white  tower is floodlit below balcony level.

History
Fisgard Lighthouse was built in 1860 to guide vessels through the entrance of Esquimalt harbour. It was named after , a British Navy ship that spent time in the Pacific.

Fisgard Lighthouse and its sister station Race Rocks Light, were constructed in 1859–60, to ease the movement of naval ships into Esquimalt harbour and merchant ships into Victoria Harbour. The light stations were also seen as a significant political and fiduciary commitment on the part of the British government to the Colony of Vancouver Island, partly in response to the American gold miners flooding into the region: some 25,000 arrived in 1858 for the Fraser gold rush.

Local legend claims that the brick and stone used in construction were sent out from Britain as ballast; in fact local brick yards and quarries supplied these materials, while the lens, lamp apparatus and lantern room were accompanied from England by the first keeper, Mr. George Davies, in 1859. The cast-iron spiral staircase in the tower was made in sections in San Francisco.

Fisgard first showed a light from the tower at sunset on 16 November 1860.

Colonial Governor James Douglas petitioned the British government to build the lighthouse. Captain Richards supported his position. Construction was supervised by Colonial Surveyor and Engineer JD Pemberton. Architects John Wright and Hermann Otto Tiedemann did the design of the lighthouse and the picturesque gothic red brick residence adjoining it.

Permanent steel shutters were added to the landward side of the lantern room some time after 1897, when concussion from the 6-inch guns at newly built Fort Rodd Hill caused cracks to appear in the lantern windows. The last keeper to actually live full-time at Fisgard was George Johnson; Josiah Gosse, Fisgard's final keeper, had permission from the lighthouse authority to live ashore (nearby on Esquimalt Lagoon), and row out to Fisgard every evening.

In the early 1940s, the acetylene lamp in Fisgard's tower was replaced by a battery-powered electric light. In 1950–51, a causeway was built out to Fisgard Island from the foreshore at Fort Rodd Hill by the Canadian Army; this was intended as a military obstacle, but also provided direct access to Fisgard Lighthouse.

Light and access

A causeway from the adjacent Fort Rodd Hill National Historic Site provides access by land.

The former lighthouse keeper's residence is open to the public and contains displays and exhibits about the site's history. The attached tower is not open to the public as it is an operational aid to navigation.

Historical designations
The lighthouse was designated a National Historic Site of Canada in 1958. It is also a Classified Federal Heritage Building.

Keepers of Fisgard Lighthouse 
George Davies, 1860–1861
John Watson, 1861
W.H. Bevis, 1861–1879 (Died on station, 1879)
Amelia Bevis, 1879–1880
Henry Cogan. 1880–1884
Joseph Dare, 1884–1898 (Drowned in Esquimalt harbour, 1898)
W. Cormack, 1898
John Davies, 1898
Douglas MacKenzie, 1898–1900
Andrew Deacon, 1900–1901
George Johnson, 1901–1909
Josiah Gosse, 1909–1928

See also
 List of lighthouses in British Columbia
 List of lighthouses in Canada

References

External links

 Canadian Coast Guard
 Aids to Navigation Canadian Coast Guard
 Fort Rodd Hill and Fisgard Lighthouse National Historic Sites – Parks Canada
 History and visitor information
The Canadian Encyclopedia Fisgard Lighthouse National Historic Site

Lighthouses completed in 1860
Lighthouses in British Columbia
Heritage sites in British Columbia
Buildings and structures in Victoria, British Columbia
National Historic Sites in British Columbia
Museums in British Columbia
Lighthouse museums in Canada
Maritime museums in British Columbia
Lighthouses on the National Historic Sites of Canada register
Classified Federal Heritage Building